Uchtdorf is a village and a former municipality in the district of Stendal, in Saxony-Anhalt, Germany. Since 31 May 2010, it is part of the town Tangerhütte.

References

Former municipalities in Saxony-Anhalt
Tangerhütte